Vice-Admiral Ahmad Tasnim  (born 1935) is a retired three-star rank admiral in the Pakistan Navy who is notable for his command of the Hangor, a submarine, that sank the INS Khukri on 8 December 1971 during the third war with India, off the Diu, Gujarat in India.

This was the first submarine kill since World War II, and the only one until a Royal Navy's Conqueror sank an Argentine cruiser General Belgrano during the Falklands War fought in 1980s. In 1990s, he was appointed chairman of the Karachi Port Trust and the Pakistan National Shipping Corporation while serving in the Navy until retiring from his service in 1994.

Biography

Early life and career in Navy 
In an interview conducted by A.H. Amin, Ahmad Tasnim stated that he was born to a Punjabi Arain family in Mianwal village, Jalandhar district, East Punjab in British India, in 1935. In the same interview, he stated that his ancestors "most likely came from Iran" and "took up agriculture as their livelihood" after settling in the "area".

His father, Mohammad Yakob, was a civil servant with Indian Civil Service of British government. In 1940, he moved with his father who was posted to Jhang in West Punjab and permanently moved to Burewala after the independence of Pakistan on 14 August as result of the partition of India.

After matriculating from a Government Islamia High School Jhang, he was admitted at the Government College University in Lahore in 1950 but left his university studies after being selected for the military service exam in 1952. In 1954, he joined the Pakistan Navy, commissioned as Midshipman and was sent to the United Kingdom to attend the Britannia Royal Naval College in Dartmouth, England. He shared his dormitory with army cadet Imranullah Khan who would also ascended into being a three-star army general. He graduated from the Britannia Royal Naval College in 1955, and was later sent to Australia for further sea training where he joined the Royal Australian Navy as an exchange officer, gaining commission as Sub-Lieutenant on 1 January 1957, and served aboard HMAS Sydney, an aircraft carrier.

Briefly serving as an exchange officer, S/Lt. Tasnim was again set to England where he attended the Royal Naval College in Greenwich, where he graduated in War studies with strong emphasis on nuclear war. During this time, he was posted in East Pakistan but return shortly after Lt. Tasnim was appointed as ADC to President Ayub Khan.

In 1963, Lt. Tasnim personally excused himself from his assignment in order to join the newly established crew that was to be trained in the United States in order to operate the submarine acquired from the United States Navy. Alongside with then-Lt.Cdr K.R. Niazi, Lt. Tasnim arrived in the New London in Connecticut where he was trained on the USS Angler for the submarine operations. In 1964, the crew of Ghazi returned to Pakistan and reported back to its base, Karachi Naval Dockyard.

War appointments in Navy: 1965 and 1971 war 

Ghazi, under command of Cdr KR Niazi, escorted the combined task group under Cdre S.M. Anwar, the OTC, to successfully raid a radar facility in Dwarka, India. Ghazi later patrolled the Arabian sea and reported back safely to its base once the ceasefire was broken by the Soviet Union between India and Pakistan.  Lt. Cdr. Tasnim was honoured with Sitara-e-Jurat, along with the Ghazi in 1966.

In 1967, Lieutenant-Commander Tasnim assumed the command of Ghazi and became concerned for her refit as time passed. After refitting of its computers, Ghazi under the command of Lt. Cdr. Tasnim embarked on the notable circumnavigation of Africa and Southern Europe in order for its mid-life update that were to be carried out in Gölcük Naval Shipyard in Turkey due to the closure of the Suez Canal because of the Six-Day War.

After the refit trials, Lt. Cdr.

Cdr. Tasnim arrived with Hangor submarines in 1970, and reported to its base in Karachi on 1 December 1970. In August 1971, Cdr. Tasnim volunteered to go behind the enemy lines to pick up intelligence on Indian Navy's movement, which was duly approved. In November 1971,  again sailed under his command with full wartime load of torpedoes, moving towards Bombay harbour, identifying the Indian armada but did not attack due to not being authorized. In an attempt to warn, Cdr. Tasnim broke the radio silence and dispatched a message that was immediately identified, leading the Indian Navy dispatching two ASW warships,  and INS Kirpan from 14th Squadron of the Western Naval Command of the Indian Navy. The Indian squadron under Captain M.N. Mullah identified Hangor on 2–3 December, and came forward to attack the submarine that was operating on the shallow waters. Cdr. Tasnim ordered the increase of depth of the submarine by 200 m and set their targets on approaching Indian Navy's ship that were now coming to attack the submarine.

At about 20:00Hrs, Cdr. Tasnim had his torpedo crew led by then-Lt. Fasih Bokhari calculate the enemy ship path and firing range, and order the crew to fire the torpedoes. The first homing torpedo did not target its ship which was aimed at Kirpan, and immediately opted a quick solution, firing second homing torpedo that hit the magazine of the Khukri. The crew of Hangor heard a loud explosion and began recording the orders being passed by Captain M.N. Mullah; a third homing torpedo was also fired but Kirpan fled the scene. Khukri sank quickly before Hangor could make an attempt to save the survivors, losing 250 men in this action including Captain M.N. Mullah.

For almost a week, Cdr. Tasnim had the Hangor submerged due to being aware of massive search and destroy mission to locate Hangor, making his way to report back to its base with depleted hydrogen batteries. According to his personal admission in 2001, Tasnim maintained: "An extensive air search combined with surface ships made our life miserable but with intelligent evasive action we managed to survive these attacks and arrived in Karachi safely after the ceasefire."

Staff and Command appointments 

Upon returning to Pakistan, Cdr. Tasnim was decorated with Sitara-e-Jurat for his actions of valour in 1972. In 1973, he was posted in Navy NHQ in Islamabad, becoming director submarine operations and assuming the command of submarine command  (COMSUBS) in 1974.  In 1975–76, Cdr. Tasnim went to United States to attend the Naval War College in Rhode Island, returning with MSc. in war studies, and appointed  "Directing Staff" at the Naval War College in Karachi.

In 1976, he was promoted to one-star assignment, and Capt. Tasnim was appointed as Director-General Naval Operations (DGNO) and then Naval Secretary at Navy NHQ in Islamabad. In 1978, Cdre. was selected by the Ministry of Defence (MoD) for a diplomatic assignment, and briefly tenured as military attaché at the Embassy of Pakistan in Paris until 1981.

Upon returning, Cdre. Tasnim was tactical officer commanding of the 25th Destroyer Squadron, later commandant of the Naval War College in Karachi and posted as the ACNS (Training) until promoted to two-star rank. In 1984, Rear-Admiral Tasnim was directed to join the faculty of National Defence University (NDU) in Islamabad, teaching courses on military studies of which then-Brig. Pervez Musharraf was also this student. He remained Chief Instructor (CI) at the NDU until 1987.

In 1987–88, Rear-Admiral Tasnim was appointed as DCNS (Personnel) and later became a senior fleet commander in 1989–91, with as three-star rank, Vice-Admiral.

In 1991, Vice-Admiral Tasnim's name was announced  to be appointed as Chairman of the National Shipping Corporation which he stayed until 1992. In 1992, Vice-Admiral Tasnim was moved as chairman of Karachi Port Trust (KPT), which he remained until his retirement from the Navy in 1994. In 1992, Vice-Admiral Tasnim was moved as chairman of Karachi Port Trust (KPT), which he remained until his retirement from the Navy in 1994.

Retirement and defence analyst 

In 2001, Admiral Tasnim refuted the Indian Navy's claim of sinking the Ghazi, maintaining on the ground that "the sub was lost due to operational accident and Indians have never claimed it as such."

In 2016, Admiral Tasnim backed the ISPR's claim of detecting the Indian Navy's submarine patrol the Karachi coast, claiming that: the Indian submarine was detected 40 nautical miles off Pakistani coast." Talking to Dawn, Tasnim was of the opinion that "the submarine had come for intelligence gathering purposes. Intelligence gathering is a common practice, but the skill is not to get caught – like we did in our times."

Popular Culture

In December 2021, ARY Digital release a telefilm Hangor S-131, based on real incidents from 1971 Indo-Pak war in which role of Tasnim was played by Zahid Ahmed.

Awards and decorations

See also 
Submarine warfare
Hangor-class submarine (1968)

Notes

References

External links 

1935 births
Living people
People from Jalandhar district
Punjabi people
People from Jhang District
Military personnel of the Indo-Pakistani War of 1965
Submarine commanders
Pakistani people of Iranian descent
Pakistani military personnel of the Indo-Pakistani War of 1971
Naval War College alumni
National Defence University, Pakistan alumni
Pakistan Navy admirals
People from Islamabad
Pakistani television personalities
Pakistani columnists
Defence and security analysts in Pakistan